Vavrinec Benedikt of Nedožery (or Nudožerinus, ; 10 August 1555, Nedožery – 4 June 1615, Prague) was a Slovak mathematician, teacher, poet, translator and philologist settled in Bohemia.

Biography
He studied in Jihlava and Prague. From 1604 he was active at the University of Prague where he taught classical philology and later mathematics. He was the dean and vice-rector of the university. He was involved in the development of Czech humanism.

He was the author of the first systematic Czech grammar (Grammaticae Bohemicae ad leges naturalis methodi conformatae, et notis numerisque illustratae ac distinctae, libri duo, 1603). He also drew attention to Slovak as a distinct language and urged Slovaks to cultivate their language decades before national linguistic revival.

See also

List of Czech writers
List of Slovak poets

References

1555 births
1615 deaths
16th-century Slovak people
16th-century Hungarian people
16th-century Hungarian poets
16th-century Bohemian people
16th-century mathematicians
16th-century writers
16th-century poets
16th-century linguists
17th-century Slovak people
17th-century Hungarian people
17th-century Hungarian poets
17th-century Bohemian people
17th-century mathematicians
17th-century writers
17th-century poets
17th-century linguists
Czech mathematicians
Czech poets
Hungarian male poets
Czech male writers
Czech translators
Linguists from the Czech Republic
Slovak mathematicians
Hungarian mathematicians
Slovak poets
Slovak translators
Linguists from Slovakia
Czech people of Slovak descent
Czech people of Hungarian descent
People from Prievidza District
Emigrants from the Kingdom of Hungary to the Kingdom of Bohemia